The dalbergioids are an early-branching monophyletic clade of the flowering plant subfamily Faboideae or Papilionaceae. They are pantropical, particularly being found in the neotropics and sub-Saharan Africa. This clade is consistently resolved as monophyletic in molecular phylogenetic analyses. It is estimated to have arisen 55.3 ± 0.5 million years ago (in the Eocene). A node-based definition for the dalbergioids is: "The least inclusive crown clade that contains Amorpha fruticosa L. 1753 and Dalbergia sissoo Roxb. ex DC. 1825." Indehiscent pods may be a morphological synapomorphy for the clade.

References

Faboideae
Pantropical flora
Plant unranked clades